Nisqually, Niskwalli, or Nisqualli may refer to:

People
 Nisqually people, a Coast Salish ethnic group
 Nisqually Indian Tribe of the Nisqually Reservation, federally recognized tribe
 Nisqually Indian Reservation, the tribe's reservation in Thurston County
 Nisqually language, a Southern Puget Sound Salish

Places

Billy Frank Jr. Nisqually National Wildlife Refuge, a protected area in the Nisqually River estuary
Fort Nisqually, the first European trading post on Puget Sound
Lake Nisqually was a proglacial lake in Washington state.
Nisqually Mission, a Methodist station
Nisqually River, located between Thurston and Pierce counties

Other
 Nisqually Glacier on Mount Rainier
 Lake Nisqually was a prehistoric lake in the lower basin of Puget Sound and the Nisqually River.
MV Nisqually, a Steel Electric-class ferry previously part of the Washington State Ferries system
Nisqually, the former cargo ship SS Suremico which was converted into a scow and lost in the Battle of Wake Island
Nisqually earthquake of 2001 in Washington
Nisqually-1, a specimen of Populus trichocarpa, whose genome was sequenced
 Diocese of Nesqually